Rodrigo Ribeiro Valente (born 15 February 2001) is a Portuguese professional footballer who plays for Penafiel on loan from Santa Clara as a midfielder.

Club career
He made his LigaPro debut for Porto B on 11 August 2019 in a game against Sporting Covilhã.

On 1 September 2021, he moved to Estoril.

Career statistics

References

External links

2001 births
Sportspeople from Santa Maria da Feira
Living people
Portuguese footballers
Portugal youth international footballers
Association football midfielders
FC Porto B players
G.D. Estoril Praia players
C.D. Santa Clara players
F.C. Penafiel players
Liga Portugal 2 players
Primeira Liga players